Prince Albert-Duck Lake was a constituency of the Legislative Assembly of Saskatchewan from 1978 to 1991.

History 
In 1991, the district became part of Prince Albert Carlton.

Geography 
The district was based in Prince Albert, Saskatchewan and Duck Lake.

Representation 

 20th Saskatchewan Legislature - Jerome Hammersmith
21st Saskatchewan Legislature - Eldon Lautermilch

References 

Former provincial electoral districts of Saskatchewan